Kids These Days may refer to:
Kids these days, stereotype about young people
Kids These Days (TV series), an American TV series (1996–1998)
Kids These Days (band), a band based in Chicago (2009–2013)
Kids These Days, a 2014 album by Judah & the Lion